Richard Towa (born 16 November 1969) is a Cameroonian professional manager and former footballer. He most recently managed I-League club Gokulam Kerala.

Playing career
He played 13 matches for the Cameroon and helped them qualify for the 1990 FIFA World Cup, but did not participate due to an injury.

Managerial career
In January 2018, he signed a contract to become manager of Dragon Club. He left in September 2018 to become new manager of Feutcheu FC. In April 2019, he resigned as manager of Feutcheu FC. On 5 December 2019, he was named new manager of Union Douala.

On 5 July 2022, Indian I-League defending champion Gokulam Kerala officially announced that they roped in Towa as their new head coach. He left by mutual consent on 26 December 2022 with the club in 4th place.

References

External links 

Richard Towa at Alemannia Aachen website

Cameroonian footballers
Cameroon international footballers
SC Fortuna Köln players
Fortuna Düsseldorf players
Living people
1969 births
KFC Uerdingen 05 managers
Panthère du Ndé players
Association footballers not categorized by position
Cameroonian football managers